Nathan Lloyd Stewart-Jarrett (born 4 December 1985) is a British actor. He starred as Curtis Donovan in the E4 series Misfits (2009–2012) and Ian in the Channel 4 series Utopia (2013–2014). He is also known for his theatre work, earning a WhatsOnStage Award nomination for his performance in Angels in America. His films include The Comedian (2012), War Book (2014), Mope (2019), and Candyman (2021).

Early life
Stewart-Jarrett was born in Wandsworth, South London. He attended the BRIT School for four years until 2003. He went on to train at the Royal Central School of Speech and Drama, graduating in 2006.

Career
Stewart-Jarrett made his professional stage debut with a number of roles in Brixton Stories at the Lyric, Hammersmith, and was in the fourth cast of The History Boys at the National Theatre.

From 2009 to 2012, Stewart starred in the E4 series Misfits as Curtis Donovan, a role he played for the first four series, making him Misfits''' longest running cast member and the last remaining original cast member until he was written out during the fourth series. In 2012, he appeared in the revival of Pitchfork Disney at the Arcola Theatre.

The year after leaving Misfits, Jarrett began starring as Ian Johnson in the Channel 4 conspiracy thriller series Utopia and made his feature film debut in the crime comedy Dom Hemingway. He also appeared in a music video by Years&Years called "Real" released in 2014.

Stewart-Jarrett played the drag queen Belize, Prior Walter's (Andrew Garfield) friend, in the 2017 National Theatre production of Tony Kushner's Angels in America directed by Marianne Elliott, for which Stewart-Jarrett was nominated for the WhatsOnStage Award for Best Supporting Actor in a Play. He made his Broadway debut when the show transferred to the Neil Simon Theatre in 2018.

In 2019, Stewart-Jarrett portrayed actor Steve Driver in the biographical film Mope and Johnny Edgecombe in the BBC One miniseries The Trial of Christine Keeler. He also had a recurring role in Four Weddings and a Funeral on Hulu and a small role in the family film The Kid Who Would Be King. This was followed in 2020 by roles in the film The Argument and the BBC series Dracula.

In 2021, Stewart-Jarrett made a guest appearance in the Doctor Who special "Revolution of the Daleks", starred as Troy Cartwright in the Candyman sequel, and had a main role as guidance counsellor Sam in the HBO Max teen comedy-drama Generation (stylised as Genera+ion). Stewart-Jarrett stars opposite George MacKay in the thriller film Femme, which premiered at the 73rd Berlinale in 2023. He has an upcoming role in the Star (Disney+) heist series Culprits.

Filmography
Film

Television

 Radio 
 Anansi Boys'' (2017), as Spider (6 episodes)

Theatre

Awards and nominations

References

External links

Black British male actors
Living people
British male television actors
Alumni of the Royal Central School of Speech and Drama
1985 births
Male actors from London
People from Wandsworth
21st-century British male actors
People educated at the BRIT School
British people of Barbadian descent